Fidel Castro proclaimed himself to be "a socialist, and Marxist–Leninist". As a Marxist–Leninist, Castro believed strongly in converting Cuba, and the wider world, from a capitalist system in which individuals own the means of production into a socialist system in which the means of production are owned by the workers. In the former, there is a class divide between the wealthy classes who control the means of production (i. e., the factories, farms, media, etc.) and the poorer working classes who labor on them, whilst in the latter, there is a decreasing class divide as the government redistributes the means of production leading to communism. Castro used Leninist thought as a model upon which to convert the Cuban state and society into a socialist form.

Influences 

Castro described two historical figures as being particular influences on his political viewpoints: the Cuban anti-imperialist revolutionary José Martí (1853–1895), and the German sociologist and theorist Karl Marx (1818–1883).

Commenting on the influence of Martí, he related that "above all", he adopted his sense of ethics because:

When he spoke that phrase I'll never be able to forget – "All the glory in the world fits into a grain of corn" – it seemed extraordinarily beautiful to me, in the face of all the vanity and ambition that one saw everywhere, and against which we revolutionaries must be on constant guard. I seized upon that ethics. Ethics, as a mode of behavior, is essential, a fabulous treasure.

On the other hand, the influence which Castro took from Marx was his "concept of what human society is", without which, Castro argued, "you can't formulate any argument that leads to a reasonable interpretation of historical events".

Castro attended schools run by Jesuits that "contributed to my development and influenced my sense of justice". Castro also stated that it was at his Jesuit-run high school that he became influenced by Falangism, the Spanish variety of national syndicalism, and its founder, José Antonio Primo de Rivera. Castro also participated in Hispanidad, a movement that criticized Anglo Saxon material values and admired the moral values of Spanish and Spanish American culture.

On the Soviet Union and its leaders 
Although a Leninist, Castro remained critical of Marxist–Leninist Joseph Stalin, who was the Premier of the Soviet Union from 1941 to 1953. In Castro's opinion, Stalin "committed serious errors – everyone knows about his abuse of power, the repression, and his personal characteristics, the cult of personality", and also held him accountable for the invasion of the Soviet Union by Nazi Germany in 1941. Fidel also stated that one of Stalin's errors was "purging the Red Army due to Nazi misinformation", which weakened the Soviet Union militarily on the eve of Operation Barbarossa. At the same time, Castro also felt that Stalin "showed tremendous merit in industrializing the country" and "in moving the military industry to Siberia", things which he felt were "decisive factors" in the defeat of Nazism.

Politics and religion  
Castro stated, "Christ chose the fishermen because he was a communist", and in his 2009 spoken autobiography, Castro said that Christianity exhibited "a group of very humane precepts" which gave the world "ethical values" and a "sense of social justice", before relating that, "If people call me Christian, not from the standpoint of religion, but from the standpoint of social vision, I declare that I am a Christian." Castro further believed that "faith is a personal matter that must be born in the conscience of every person. But atheism shouldn't be used as a rallying cry".

In his book "Fidel and Religion", Castro opines that there is a "great coincidence between Christianity's objectives and the ones we Communists seek, between the Christian teachings of humility, austerity, selflessness, and loving thy neighbour and what we might call the content of a revolutionary's life and behaviour". Castro saw a similarity to his goals with the goals of Christ: "Christ multiplied the fish and the loaves to feed the people. That is precisely what we want to do with the Revolution and socialism", adding that, "I believe Karl Marx could have subscribed to the Sermon on the Mount". However Castro is critical of the historical role of the Catholic Church which he describes as "a tool for domination, exploitation, and oppression for centuries".

On Israel and anti-Semitism 
In September 2010, The Atlantic began publishing a series of articles by Jeffrey Goldberg, based on extensive and wide-ranging interviews by Goldberg and Julia E. Sweig with Castro, the first of which lasted five hours. Castro contacted Goldberg after he read one of Goldberg's articles on whether Israel would launch a pre-emptive air strike on Iran, should it come close to acquiring nuclear weapons. While warning against the dangers of Western confrontation with Iran in which, inadvertently, "a gradual escalation could become a nuclear war", Castro "unequivocally" defended Israel's right to exist and condemned anti-Semitism, while criticizing some of the rhetoric on Israel by Mahmoud Ahmadinejad, the President of Iran, under whom Iran–Israel relations became increasingly hostile: 

Asked by Goldberg if he would tell Ahmadinejad the same things, Castro responded: "I am saying this so you can communicate it." Castro "criticized Ahmadinejad for denying the Holocaust, and explained why the Iranian government would better serve the cause of peace by acknowledging the 'unique' history of anti-Semitism and trying to understand why Israelis fear for their existence".

Public image 

By wearing military-style uniforms and leading mass demonstrations, Castro projected an image of a perpetual revolutionary. He was mostly seen in military attire, but his personal tailor, Merel Van 't Wout, convinced him to occasionally change to a business suit. Castro is often referred to as "Comandante" ("Commander"), but is also nicknamed "El Caballo" ("The Horse"), a label that was first attributed to Cuban entertainer Benny Moré, who, on hearing Castro passing in the Havana night with his entourage, shouted out: "Here comes the horse!".

During the Cuban Revolution campaign, fellow rebels knew Castro as "The Giant". Large throngs of people gathered to cheer at Castro's fiery speeches, which typically lasted for hours. Many details of Castro's private life, particularly involving his family members, are scarce as the media is forbidden to mention them. Castro was determined to avoid the creation of a cult of personality around himself. Few public images of Castro are visible around Cuba and his birthday is not celebrated. Instead dead revolutionaries such as Che Guevara and Camilo Cienfuegos are celebrated.

Castro took a relatively socially conservative stance on many issues, opposing drug use, gambling, and prostitution, which he viewed as moral evils. Instead, he advocated hard work, family values, integrity, and self-discipline. Although his government repressed homosexuality for decades, later in his life, he took responsibility for this persecution, regretting it as a "great injustice", as he himself put it.

See also
 Religious views of Fidel Castro
 Communist Party of Cuba

References

Further reading 
 
 Theodore Draper: Castroism: Theory and Practice. New York: Praeger 1965.
 Iain McLean,Alistair McMillan: The concise Oxford dictionary of politics. Oxford University Press 2009, p. 66.
 Frank O. Mora, Jeanne A. K. Hey: Latin American and Caribbean Foreign Policy. Rowman & Littlefield 2003, p. 98-102.

Politics of Cuba
Fidel Castro
State ideologies